Disney Channel was a British, Northern Irish and Irish television kids channel owned and operated by The Walt Disney Company (UK) Ltd.

It was aired from 1 October 1995, to 30 September 2020. A one-hour timeshift service called Disney Channel +1 was available on Sky and Virgin Media. At the time of closure, the channel had two sister channels; Disney Junior and Disney XD.

History

Pre-launch 
Disney Channel was originally planned to launch in 1989 on Sky Television. It was featured in much of the promotional material surrounding the launch of Sky Television and the Astra satellite. The joint venture with Sky collapsed in May 1989 after discussion about the venture had been taking place since November 1988, but Disney felt it was no longer on equal footing on "decision-making responsibility" in 50-50 partnership. Disney was supposed to start up two channels, but when the talks broke down, Sky issued a lawsuit against Disney, claiming £1.5 billion in damages. The suit was later settled with Disney selling its stake in the joint venture back to Sky, and agreeing to license its movie library for a five-year period.

Post-launch 
In early 1995, Disney formed a new 50-50 partnership with Compagnie Luxembourgeoise de Télédiffusion. In doing so, Disney and CLT both launched a new jointly-owned family-targeted channel, Super RTL, in April 1995, broadcasting throughout Germany and portions of Austria and Luxembourg. 7 months later, the Disney Channel eventually launched in the UK on Sky on October 1, 1995, being the second Disney Channel launched outside the United States, next to Taiwan began on March 29, 1995. Its first broadcast was the UKTV premier of the 1967 film The Jungle Book.

In September 1997, The Disney Channel gained a new look and logo, to coincide with the launch of its French counterpart, and The Disney Channel's name was shortened to simply "Disney Channel". By this point, Disney Channel began to air more programmes than movies, although the latter was still the main focus. Around this time, a pre-school block called the "Under-Fives block" began airing, featuring mostly acquired preschool programming. A new set of idents were introduced in 1998.

In 1999, Disney Channel gained a new look, and in September 1999, a Playhouse Disney branded programming block was launched, being the first Playhouse Disney to launch outside the United States.

In September 2000, Disney Television International launched three additional channels for Sky Digital: a standalone Playhouse Disney channel, Toon Disney and a one-hour timeshift to Disney Channel. Until 2002 and 2003 respectively, these networks were not available on NTL or Telewest, both of which at the time could still only receive Disney Channel. Likely due to this, the Playhouse Disney block remained airing until July 2004.

On 30 June 2001, Disney Channel ceased broadcasting on Sky's analogue satellite service.

In March 2006, changes were made to the Disney services in the UK. Disney Channel and Playhouse Disney ceased to be premium add-on channels and instead operated as part of basic-level subscription packages. This resulted in the "premium" part of Disney Channel's offering, the Disney movies and some of its animation, being merged with Toon Disney to create Disney Cinemagic, which was launched to take the Disney slot in the Sky Movies premium bundle; Toon Disney was replaced with Disney Cinemagic, Toon Disney closed at 6am and Disney Cinemagic launched at 10am. Disney Channel +1 closed and was replaced with Disney Cinemagic +1. However, Disney Channel +1 subsequently returned in June 2006.

In October 2006, Disney Channel was added to Top Up TV Anytime that downloads programming overnight from various channels to a Thomson DTI 6300-16. In 2007, Disney added more On Demand content to Virgin Media's service. In November 2007, it was announced Disney Channel would join the lineup for Picnic, BSkyB's proposed new pay-TV service for DTT. It began broadcasting in 16:9 widescreen in May 2010. A new set of program mini-idents that would play before the program would start were launched in September 2010. In September 2011, a new logo was adopted. The same month, an HD version launched on Sky. In July 2013, a new website was launched with On Demand services and commercial advertisements started to air, and a year later the channel received a full relaunch.

Closure
Disney Channel, along with its sister channels Disney Junior and Disney XD, were closed in the UK on 1 October 2020. The closure occurred exactly 25 years after the channel launched in 1995.

The channels were removed from Virgin Media and Sky, and its content were moved exclusively to Disney+. The final programme to be broadcast before its closure was the 2019 film Descendants 3. It then showed adverts and "I Want This" from Raven's Home, followed by an ident which froze for a few seconds and then cut to an image slide featuring the channel's logo, signalling the channel's closure. Despite its closure, the brand name remains active on social media sites like YouTube.

The channels were removed from Virgin Media on September 29, the day before the shutdown, with CBBC and CBeebies taking the network's former Sky EPG slots on October 1.

Programming
The majority of the channel's programming schedule was formed from the syndication of television series from its American counterpart. However, the channel did occasionally act as host for homegrown UK and Irish series, including The Evermoor Chronicles, The Lodge,101 Dalmatian Street and Sadie Sparks.

Interactivity
Disney Channel formerly had an interactive television service on Sky, in which viewers were able to press the red button on their Sky remote to access information about their series, character profiles, detailed television listings, quizzes, and messages submitted by viewers.

Website
Disney Channel's website featured information, games, interactive features and contact details and submission forms. The site had been made entirely in Adobe Flash since 1 May 1999, the same day as the 1999 re-brand. In May 2003, it was redesigned to fit with the other Disney Channel's worldwide after the global re-brand. In 2007, it was added to disneychannel.co.uk, when the website's homepage was revamped to fit the look of the American site. In 2011, along with the other Disney sites, it was revamped. In September 2011, it was revamped once again, due to the new logo.

Presentation
In October 1995, the Disney Channel in the UK's logo was a simplified Mickey Mouse head, with 'The Disney Channel' text on the bottom. Six identifications for the 1995 logo were created by Lambie-Nairn. In February 1997, the channel dropped 'The' from its name, with a new logo, for the launch of Disney Channel France. In 1997, Disney Channel France adopted the same logo and identifications. In 1999, Disney Channel refreshed its identity as it launched its new "Circles" logo, with symmetrical circles forming the iconic Mickey Mouse head shape. The new set identification was created in CGI animation, with various objects forming the Disney Channel logo. The new identity package was created by French graphic design company, GÉDÉON. According to GÉDÉON, the new logo is also described as an "experimental field for animation". More than 30 illustrators, animators, graphic designers, directors, and motion graphic studios, such as Gamma Studios, Estructura7, Velvet mediendesign, and Pedall, collaborated with the project.

When the new look was first launched, nine identifications aired on the same day. Some of the identifications were also used on its sister channel, Playhouse Disney.

References

External links
 
 
 

Disney television channels in the United Kingdom
UK and Ireland
Children's television channels in Ireland
Children's television channels in the United Kingdom
English-language television stations in the United Kingdom
English-language television stations in Ireland
Television channels and stations established in 1995
1995 establishments in Ireland
1995 establishments in the United Kingdom
2020 disestablishments in Ireland
2020 disestablishments in the United Kingdom
Television channels and stations disestablished in 2020
Defunct television channels in the United Kingdom
Television channel articles with incorrect naming style